A nightlight is a small, usually electrical, light source placed for comfort or convenience in indoor dark areas or areas that become dark at certain times.

Nightlight, Nightlite, Night light, Nightlighting, or night-lighting may also refer to:

Businesses and organizations
 Nightlight Christian Adoptions, an adoption agency specializing in embryo adoptions

Film, television, and literature
 Nightlight (2003 film), a television film starring Shannen Doherty
 NightLights, a 2014 multi-award-winning film starring Shawna Waldron
 Nightlight (2015 film), an American supernatural thriller film
 Night Light (TV series), a 2016 South Korean television series
 "Night Light", a 2007 SpongeBob SquarePants episode
 Night Light, a 1953 novel by Douglass Wallop
 "Night Lights" (Criminal Minds), a 2018 episode
 Night Light, an alias of Kamala Khan in the Marvel Cinematic Universe

Albums
 Night Light (2nd Chapter of Acts album), a 1985 album
 Night Light (Kevin Hearn and Thin Buckle album), a 2004 album
 Night Lights (Elliott Murphy album), a 1975 album
 Night Lights (Gerry Mulligan album), a 1963 album
 Night Lights (Gene Ammons album), a 1970 album
 Night Lights (Punchline album), a 2009 album
 Night-Light (Miyuki Nakajima album), a 2012 album
 Nightlight, a 2014 album by Zee Avi
 Nightlights (album), a 2010 album by Jimmy Needham

Extended plays
 Nightlight (EP), a 2006 album by Megan Washington and Sean Foran.

Songs
 "Night Light" (song), a 2012 song by UK singer Jessie Ware
 "Night Light", a 2021 song by the Rions
 "Night Light", a 2002 song on the Aesop Rock EP Daylight
 "Night Light", a 2005 song by Sleater-Kinney from their album The Woods
 "Night Light", a 2014 song by Pink Floyd from their album The Endless River
 "Night Light", a 2017 song by Sara Evans from her album Words
 "Night Lights" (Nat King Cole song), a 1956 song
 "Night Lights", a 1963 song by Gerry Mulligan
 Nightlight, a 2015 song by Silversun Pickups from their album Better Nature
 "Nightlite", a 2006 song by Bonobo from his album Days to Come

Other uses
 Analog nightlight, a period permitting analog transmissions during the U.S. changeover to digital television
 Night light, a feature of the Windows 10 Creator's Update which shifts the color temperature of the display to a warm color at night